Brett Stuart Patrick Hudson (born January 18, 1953) is an American musician and singer-songwriter. He was the youngest member of the musical group the Hudson Brothers, which was formed by his older brothers, Mark and Bill, in 1965. He is now a TV producer and writer.

Early life
Hudson was born and raised in Portland, Oregon, the youngest of three boys, (Mark and Bill are his two elder brothers) born to Eleanor (née Salerno) and  William Louis Hudson. His mother was Italian American (his maternal grandfather came from Carlentini, Province of Syracuse, Sicily, Italy). He and his brothers were nephews of actor Keenan Wynn. Hudson's father walked out on the family when he was six, and Eleanor was forced to raise her boys alone, relying on welfare to raise her boys during their upbringing. He was raised Roman Catholic.

Career
Hudson formed the production company Frozen Pictures with Burt Kearns. He has produced many television shows including All the Presidents' Movies with Martin Sheen for Bravo, The Secret History of Rock 'N' Roll for Court TV hosted by Gene Simmons of KISS as well as Fox TV's A Current Affair. He also co-wrote and produced the Burt Reynolds movie Cloud 9. In 2012, Hudson co-produced Hansel & Gretel Get Baked released theatrically by Tribeca Film.  He previewed his movie The Chris Montez Story with Chris Montez at The Fest for Beatles Fans convention held March 2010 in Secaucus, New Jersey.

He can be heard singing background on an odd assortment of CDs including Alice Cooper's 1994 The Last Temptation and Ringo Starr's 1999 I Wanna Be Santa Claus. He is also a trumpet player.

Honors and awards
Hudson received the 2009 Las Vegas Film Festival's Golden Ace Award in the Documentary Feature category for The Seventh Python.

Personal life
Hudson married Lavinia Lang in 1992.

He was diagnosed with stage 4 throat cancer in 2007 and after receiving many conventional as well as alternative cancer treatments has been in remission since 2009. He is the uncle of singer/songwriter Sarah Hudson, actress Kate Hudson of Almost Famous and actor Oliver Hudson of Splitting Up Together.

Filmography

Producing and directing

Acting

References

External links

1953 births
Living people
American multi-instrumentalists
American people of English descent
American people of Italian descent
Catholics from Oregon
Cleveland High School (Portland, Oregon) alumni
Film producers from Oregon
Hudson family (show business)
Musicians from Portland, Oregon
Singer-songwriters from Oregon
Writers from Portland, Oregon
American male singer-songwriters